Gelechia ochrocorys is a moth of the family Gelechiidae. It is found in the Democratic Republic of Congo (Katanga).

References

Moths described in 1936
Gelechia